The Black Diamond is a 1922 French silent mystery film directed by André Hugon and starring Claude Mérelle, Ginette Maddie and Armand Bernard.

Cast
 Claude Mérelle as Fräulein
 Ginette Maddie as Nora
 Armand Bernard as Gottfried
 Pierre Fresnay as Bouvier
 Henry Krauss as Monsieur de Mitry
 Romuald Joubé as Monsieur de Fresnay
 Charles de Rochefort
 Irène Sabel
 Jean Toulout

References

Bibliography
 Rège, Philippe. Encyclopedia of French Film Directors, Volume 1. Scarecrow Press, 2009.

External links

1922 films
Films directed by André Hugon
French silent feature films
French mystery films
French black-and-white films
1922 mystery films
Silent mystery films
1920s French films
1920s French-language films